Qasam Se Qasam Se is a 2012 Indian Hindi language romance film. The movie was directed by Ashfaq Makrani, starring Faith Mehra, Farhan and Satish Kaushik. The film is a love story between Rohan (Azim Rizvi) and Faith (Faith Mehra). The film is set in a college.

Cast 
 Faith Mehra as Faith
 Farhan
 Satish Kaushik 
 Sandeep Kochar as Professor Tripati
 Omkar Das Manikpuri 		
 Azim Rizvi as Rohan
 Akbar Sami 		
 Rakhi Sawant as Delnaz Doodhwala
 Latesh Sharma as Vicky
 Mukesh Tiwari

Soundtrack 
 Bolne Main Kya Jaata - Mika Singh, Shailendra Kumar
 Har Varak - Shaan
 Mumkin Nahi - Kunal Ganjawala, Monali Thakur
 Rokade Ki Maya - Neeraj Shridhar
 Tujhe Paya To - Mohit Chauhan
 Tum Kaha Ho - KK
 Zindagi Kah Rahi Hai - Mohit Chauhan

References

External links 
 

Indian teen romance films
2012 films